Cavernas de Repechón (Caverns of Repechon), or Cuevas De Los Pajaros Nocturnos (Caves of the Night Birds), is a karst cave system located in Carrasco National Park, Chapare Province, Bolivia. The park is home to a population of oilbirds, and is rarely visited as it very difficult to approach, and very remote.

References

Caves of Bolivia